My Dear Old Southern Home is the title of a recording by American folk music artist Doc Watson, released in 1991.

Reception

Writing for Allmusic, music critic Thom Owens wrote of the album "For some fans, My Dear Old Southern Home will seem like it lacks Watson's signature guitar work, but it's a wonderful, warm listen"

Track listing
 "My Dear Old Southern Home" (Ellsworth Cozzens, Jimmie Rodgers) – 2:22
 "The Ship That Never Returned" (Henry Clay Work) – 3:15
 "Your Long Journey" (Watson, Watson) – 2:45
 "My Friend Jim" (Traditional) – 3:29
 "No Telephone in Heaven" (A. P. Carter) – 4:33
 "Dream of the Miner's Child" (Andrew Jenkins) – 2:51
 "Wreck of the Old Number Nine" (Carson Robison) – 2:51
 "Grandfather's Clock" (Henry Clay Work) – 3:50
 "Don't Say Goodbye If You Love Me" (Jimmie Davis, Bonnie Dodd) – 3:44
 "Sleep, Baby, Sleep" (Jimmie Rodgers) – 2:53
 "Signal Light" (Davis, Neal, Watson) – 2:48
 "That Silver Haired Daddy of Mine" (Gene Autry, Jimmie Long) – 4:20
 "Life Is Like a River" (Watson) – 2:46

Personnel
Doc Watson – guitar, autoharp, harmonica, vocals
Jack Lawrence – guitar
Sam Bush – mandolin
T. Michael Coleman – bass
Stuart Duncan – fiddle, mandolin
Roy M. "Junior" Huskey – bass
Alan O'Bryant – harmony vocals
Mark Schatz – bass
Jerry Douglas - dobro
Production notes
Produced by T. Michael Coleman
Engineered by Bil VornDick

References

External links
 Doc Watson discography

1991 albums
Doc Watson albums
Sugar Hill Records albums